Kevin Lewis (born 19 September 1940 in Ellesmere Port) is an English former professional footballer who played as a winger in the Football League for Sheffield United, Liverpool and Huddersfield Town.

He also played for Wigan Athletic in the Cheshire League, scoring three goals in eight games.

References

External links
 LFChistory.net player profile
 League stats at Neil Brown's site

1940 births
Living people
People from Ellesmere Port
English footballers
Association football forwards
Sheffield United F.C. players
Liverpool F.C. players
Huddersfield Town A.F.C. players
Wigan Athletic F.C. players
Washington Diplomats (NASL) players
English Football League players
North American Soccer League (1968–1984) players
Sportspeople from Cheshire
Association football midfielders
English expatriate sportspeople in the United States
Expatriate soccer players in the United States
English expatriate footballers